Pakistan, officially the Islamic Republic of Pakistan is a country in South Asia.

It may be used to refer to:

Places
 Little Pakistan, the global term for urban ethnic enclaves populated primarily by overseas Pakistanis
 Pakistan, India, a village in the Bihar state of India
 Pakestan, a village in the Ardabil Province of Iran

Historical
 Dominion of Pakistan, an independent federal dominion in the British Empire from August 1947 to March 1956
 West Pakistan, former western provincial wing of Pakistan from 1955 until the 1971 Bangladesh Liberation War (now Pakistan)
 East Pakistan, former eastern provincial wing of Pakistan from 1955 until the 1971 Bangladesh Liberation War (now Bangladesh)

Institutes

 Pakistan International Airlines, the International airlines carrier of Pakistan.

See also